The women's individual recurve competition at the 2019 European Games was held from 21 to 26 June 2019 at the Olympic Sports Complex in Minsk, Belarus. It was the second time the event was held as part of the European Games archery programme. A total of 48 archers from 32 different nations entered the competition, with a maximum of three entries per country. The event offered one qualifying spot for the women's individual event at the 2020 Summer Olympics for any archer reaching the semi-finals from a nation that had not already qualified. The defending champion, Karina Winter of Germany, did not take part following her retirement from the sport.

Gabriela Bayardo of the Netherlands set a new Games record in the ranking round for total number of points scored from 72 arrows. Tatiana Andreoli defeated Lucilla Boari in an all-Italian final, securing their nation's third and fourth archery medals of the 2019 European Games. Bayardo defeated Russia's Anna Balsukova to win the bronze medal and secure the available qualification for the Olympics the following year, the first for a Dutch female archer since 1996.

Background

Qualification
A total of 48 places were available for the event. As host nation, Belarus received automatic qualification of three of its archers. Qualification for the remaining positions took place principally through the European Outdoor Archery Championship held in Legnica, Poland in August and September 2018, and the European Grand Prix event held in April 2019.  Five 'Universality' places were additionally determined by the European Olympic Committee and World Archery Europe to add representation from National Olympic Committees that otherwise would have not qualified.

Format

The event was an outdoor target archery event using recurve bows. Held under the World Archery-approved rules, archers shot at a 122 cm-wide target from a distance of 70 metres, each arrow being awarded between one and ten points depending on how close it landed to the centre of the target. The competition consisted of three stages: an initial ranking round, five elimination rounds, and two finals matches deciding the medal placings. In the ranking round, each of the 48 archers entering the competition shot a total of 72 arrows. The total score of each archer was used to seed the archers into the following five-round single-elimination tournament, the highest-scoring archer receiving the number one seed. If two or more archers finished with the same total score, the number of arrows shot in the central 10-ring on the target was used as a tie-breaker. If two or more archers were still tied, then the number of arrows shot within the inner-10 ring determined the finishing positions.

The elimination rounds used the Archery Olympic Round set system used in international recurve archery events since 2010. Each match consisted of a maximum of five sets, with archers each shooting three arrows per set, alternating one arrow at a time. The archer with the best score from their three arrows won the set, earning two points. The archer with the lowest score in each set received zero points. If the score was tied, each archer received one point. The first archer to six points was declared the winner. If the match was tied 5-5 after the maximum 5 sets were played, a single tie-breaker arrow was used with the closest to centre of the target winning.

Schedule

Report

Ranking and elimination rounds
Michelle Kroppen and Lisa Unruh of Germany, Ksenia Perova of Russia, and Yasemin Anagoz of Turkey entered as the highest ranked archers in the World Archery rankings, Kroppen holding the highest position at world number five.

The ranking round took place in the afternoon of 21 August, the opening day of the Games. Gabriela Bayardo topped the table with a new European Games record of 666 points, beating the previous record set by Unruh in 2015 by four points. The German trio of Kroppen, Unruh, and Elena Richter were forced to borrow bows from other competitors for the ranking round as their equipment had not arrived at the Olympic Sports Complex from the airport. Shooting with an unfamiliar bow is considered a disadvantage, and Unruh stated that they had one hour to learn the new bows before the competition commenced. As a result, the German Shooting and Archery Federation commented that the three entered the elimination rounds from a weaker starting position, with the 1/16 elimination round seeing both Unruh meeting top seed Bayardo and Kroppen and Richter facing off in an all-German tie. Bayardo and Kroppen both emerged victorious to advance to the 1/8 elimination round, Kroppen stating afterwards that "[i]t's always a stupid feeling when you have to compete against a teammate very early... [o]f course it annoys me to send a teammate out of the race. I think this match was one of the hardest".

The two medalists from the 2015 European Games contesting the event, Maja Jager of Denmark and Alicia Marín of Spain, each failed to progress far into the tournament. Jager, the silver medalist from 2015, was disappointed with her finish in the ranking round - her 20th place was described by Danish news agency Ritzau as a "modest" result - the Dane conceding afterwards that she struggled with the wind as well as her focus in the first half of the round. With 2015 bronze medalist Marín seeded 13th, Jager's win in the opening round meant the two met in the 1/16 elimination round, a repeat of their semi-final match in Baku four years previously. Jager again emerged victorious with Marín struggling to maintain her form from the ranking round. Jager was however eliminated in the following round by Inna Stepanova of Russia in a close match which saw the two tie scores in each of the five sets they played, Stepanova edging out Jager in the subsequent one-arrow shoot-off eight points to seven. With the elimination of Jager's teammates Anne Laursen and Randi Degn in the 1/32 round and the quarter-finals respectively, Denmark's participation in the event ended with them failing to add to their bronze medal victory in the women's team event.

The progression of Italians Tatiana Andreoli and Lucilla Boari to the gold medal final was considered a surprise by OA Sports after the pair had underperformed in the women's team recurve event as well as the 2019 World Archery Championships held earlier that month. Twelfth seed Andreoli shot strongly to defeat fifth seed Audrey Adiceom of France, fourth seed Stepanova, and top seed Bayardo in succession to reach the final, holding out in a double arrow shoot-off against the Frenchwoman and then recovering to come from behind to beat Stepanova in the quarter-finals. Boari meanwhile unexpectedly triumphed against Kroppen in the 1/8 elimination round before seeing off the third-seed Belorussian Karyna Kazlouskaya on her way to the semi-finals. The semi-final encounters, beginning at midday on 26 June, saw Andreoli capitalise on what OA Sports described as a "mediocre" display by Bayardo to win in four sets, while Boari delivered a comprehensive straight sets victory against Russia's Anna Balsukova to set up an all-Italian final.

Medal matches
As the two losing archers from the semi-finals, Bayardo and Balsukova met to contest the bronze medal match. Bayardo won the encounter in a convincing manner in four sets, admitting that she underperformed in the semi-final against Andreoli due to receiving the news that she successfully qualified a spot for the Netherlands at the 2020 Summer Olympics. It had been more than two decades since the last Dutch female participation at an Olympic archery event, when Lyudmila Arzhannikova and Christel Verstegen competed at the 1996 Summer Olympics in Atlanta. Following her bronze medal win Bayardo reflected that "I was really excited. I wanted to cry. I was really happy. It was just a mix of emotions... [t]he time was too short and I needed to shoot, and I couldn’t handle that.”

The gold medal final featuring Andreoli and Boari was the first all-Italian final played at such a high level in international archery. The pair both started the match strongly, Andreoli scoring two consecutive 10s to take the first set before Boari held her nerve to tie the second set at 28-28. Andreoli however showed greater consistency over the next two sets, and with Boari faltering by shooting three sevens in her final six arrows, Andreoli shot a pair of 26 scores to wrap up the match and take the gold medal.

The victory was Andreoli's first individual medal triumph at a senior competition, while Boari's silver was her second medal of the Games after winning gold with Mauro Nespoli in the mixed team recurve three days earlier. Erik Nicolaysen of OA Sports considered the gold and silver medal successes for the Italian pair as a partial redemption of their poor performances leading into the event. He also wrote that despite her loss, Boari's runner-up finish was an encouraging sign for future events. Boari nevertheless conceded that she had shot poorly, and Andreoli admitted that her personal target ahead of the competition had been to just reach the quarter-finals. She however attributed her victory to the accommodating conditions and her ability to find the right frame of mind, describing it as "the perfect day".

Records
Prior to the competition, the existing world, European and Games records were as follows:

72 arrow ranking round

The following new records were set:

Results

Ranking round
Key
 Advanced to 1/16 elimination round 
 Advanced to 1/32 elimination round

Elimination rounds

Section 1

Section 2

Section 3

Section 4

Note: An asterisk (*) denotes a win from a one-arrow shoot-off 
Source:

Finals

Source:

See also
Archery at the 2018 Asian Games – Women's individual recurve
Archery at the 2019 Pan American Games – Women's individual recurve

References

External links
Archery at the Official 2019 European Games website

Women's individual recurve
2019 in women's archery